Chaharta Gav (also Romanized as Chahārtā Gāv) is a village in Sefid Sang Rural District, Qalandarabad District, Fariman County, Razavi Khorasan Province, Iran. At the 2006 census, its population was 8, in 4 families.

References 

Populated places in Fariman County